The South Fork Alsea River is a tributary of the Alsea River in the U.S. state of Oregon. It begins at northeast of Horton on the east side of the Central Oregon Coast Range and flows generally northwest to near Alsea. There it joins the North Fork Alsea River to form the main stem.

Fishing for wild cutthroat trout is "excellent", and the stream also supports a population of steelhead. The Bureau of Land Management (BLM) oversees much of the territory through which the river flows.

Alsea Falls Recreation Area, managed by the BLM, is along the river. Open from May 1 through October 31, it has campsites and day-use sites with tent pads, fire rings, picnic tables, toilets, and drinking water. Hiking trails from the recreation area through the forest lead to several waterfalls. The nearby Fall Creek Trail system for mountain bikes has  of forested routes for all skill levels.

Tributaries
Listed from source to mouth, the named tributaries are Williams, Coleman, and Fall creeks, which enter from the left; Peak Creek, right; Blackberry and Rock creeks, left; Dubuque Creek, right; Table Creek, left; Cedar and Headrick creeks, right, and Bummer Creek, left.

See also
List of rivers of Oregon

References

External links
 Alsea Watershed Council

.
Rivers of Oregon
Rivers of Lane County, Oregon
Rivers of Benton County, Oregon